KXAR (1490 AM, "KXAR 1490AM Classic Hits") is a radio station broadcasting a classic hits  format. Licensed to Hope, Arkansas, United States, the station is currently owned by Newport Broadcasting Company.

History
KXAR began broadcasting December 12, 1947, as a Mutual affiliate on 1490 kHz with 250 watts power. It was owned by the Hope Broadcasting Company.

Previous logo
  (KXAR's logo under previous talk format)

References

External links

XAR
Classic hits radio stations in the United States